This is a list of seasons by the Shopinas.com Clickers/Air21 Express franchise of the Philippine Basketball Association. For the records of the FedEx/Air21 Express team that exists from 2002 to 2011, see List of Barako Bull Energy seasons

Season-by-season records
*one-game playoffs**team had the twice-to-beat advantage

Per season records